Leonida Caraiosifoglu (born 31 October 1944) is a Romanian racewalker. He competed in the men's 20 kilometres walk at the 1968 Summer Olympics.

References

1944 births
Living people
Athletes (track and field) at the 1968 Summer Olympics
Romanian male racewalkers
Olympic athletes of Romania
Place of birth missing (living people)